Vladimir Borisovich Golitsyn (21 June 1731 - 25 December 1798, Moscow) was a Russian statesman.

Life
He was the son of Boris Vasilevich Golitsyn (1705-1769) and his wife Ekaterina Ivanovna Strešneva. In 1766 he married countess Natalya Petrovna Chernyshyova, a lady in waiting to Catherine the Great. They had five children:

Pyotr Vladimirovich (1767-1778);
Boris Vladimirovich (1769-1813);
Ekaterina Vladimirovna (1770-1854), married Stepan Stepanovich Apraksin, with whom she had five children;
Dmitry Vladimirovich (1771-1844), married Tat'jana Vasil'evna Vasil'čikova, with whom he had five children;
Sofia Vladimirovna (1775-1845), married Pavel Alexandrovich Stroganov, with whom she had five children.

In winter they lived in the city; in summer they lived on Viaziomy Manor, 40 km to the west of Moscow. Around 1784 he probably ordered to modernize the architecture style of their "datcha".
He died in 1798 and was buried in the Donskoy Monastery in Moscow.

Sources
 Серчевский Е. Записки о роде князей Голицыных. СПб, 1853, с. 107.

Politicians of the Russian Empire
1731 births
1798 deaths